In cryptography, PKCS stands for "Public Key Cryptography Standards". These are a group of public key cryptography standards devised and published by RSA Security LLC, starting in the early 1990s.  The company published the standards to promote the use of the cryptography techniques to which they had patents, such as the RSA algorithm, the Schnorr signature algorithm and several others. Though not industry standards (because the company retained control over them), some of the standards have begun to move into the "standards track" processes of relevant standards organizations in recent years, such as the IETF and the PKIX working group.

See also
 Cryptographic Message Syntax

References

General

External links
 About PKCS (appendix G from RFC 3447)
 OASIS PKCS 11 TC (technical committee home page)

Cryptography standards
Public-key cryptography
Standards of the United States